Turley is an unincorporated community and census-designated place (CDP) in San Juan County, New Mexico, United States. It was first listed as a CDP prior to the 2020 census.

The CDP is in the northeast part of the county, on the southeast side of the San Juan River. To the northwest, across the river, is the community of Blanco. U.S. Route 64 passes through Turley, leading west  to Bloomfield and east  to Dulce.

Demographics

Education 
The area school district is Bloomfield Schools. Bloomfield High School is the local high school.

References 

Census-designated places in San Juan County, New Mexico
Census-designated places in New Mexico